Léon Sagnol (5 October 1891 – 7 June 1991) was a French politician.

Sagnol was born in Le Puy-en-Velay. He represented the Radical Party in the National Assembly from 1956 to 1958.

References 

1891 births
1991 deaths
People from Le Puy-en-Velay
Politicians from Auvergne-Rhône-Alpes
Radical Party (France) politicians
Deputies of the 3rd National Assembly of the French Fourth Republic
French military personnel of World War I